Grobbendonk is a municipality located in the Belgian province of Antwerp. The municipality comprises the towns of Bouwel and Grobbendonk proper. In 2021, Grobbendonk had a total population of 11,249. The total area is 28.36 km².

The official flag of Grobbendonk was adopted in 1989. In terms of heraldry, the flag is quartered, I and IV argent, three hills vert, a bird sable (specifically a raven), II and III gules three fleur-de-lis argent.

Lord of Grobbendonk
The house of Ursel is still lord of Grobbendonk, owner of the Heerlijkheid.

The heerlijkheid was in 1545 property of Erasmus II Schetz, the first Baron was his grandson Antonie II Schetz, Baron of Grobbendonck. The next generations were created Count of Grobbendonk, amongst these descendant duke of Ursel who was hereditary Count of Grobbendonk.

Famous inhabitants
 Rik Van Looy, cyclist, twice World Cycling Champion
 Herman Van Springel, cyclist, finished second in the Tour de France

Gallery

References

External links

Official website - Only available in Dutch

 
Municipalities of Antwerp Province
Populated places in Antwerp Province